Theoxena, also known as Theoxena the Younger to distinguish her from her mother (flourished possibly late second half of 4th century BC and first half of 3rd century BC), was a Syracusan Greek Princess and was a noblewoman of high status.

Family background
Theoxena was a woman of Sicilian origin. She was the daughter born to Agathocles and his third wife Theoxena and had a brother called Archagathus.

Her father Agathocles, was a Greek Tyrant of Syracuse, who later became King of Sicily. Theoxena had two paternal-half posthumous brothers: Archagathus and Agathocles; one paternal half-sister Lanassa who was the second wife of King Pyrrhus of Epirus and a posthumous paternal half-nephew Archagathus. Theoxena was the namesake of her mother.

Her mother Theoxena was a Greek Macedonian noblewoman. She was the second daughter and third child born to the noblewoman Berenice I and her first husband, an obscure nobleman called Philip. Theoxena’s biological maternal grandfather Philip, served as a military officer in the service of the Greek King Alexander the Great and was known in commanding one division of the Phalanx in Alexander’s wars. Theoxena’s maternal grandmother Berenice I, was the great-niece of the powerful Regent Antipater and she was a distant collateral relative to the Argead dynasty. Her full blooded maternal uncle was Magas of Cyrene and her full-blooded maternal aunt was Antigone.

Her biological maternal grandfather Philip died about 318 BC. After his death, Berenice I travelled with her children to live in Egypt, where she eventually married Ptolemy I Soter the first Greek Pharaoh and founder of the Ptolemaic dynasty. Through her grandmother’s second marriage to Ptolemy I, Berenice I was an Egyptian Queen and the Queen mother of the Ptolemaic dynasty, thus her mother was a stepdaughter to Ptolemy I and became an Egyptian Princess. Her maternal grandmother had with Ptolemy I three children; two daughters, Arsinoe II, Philotera and the future Pharaoh Ptolemy II Philadelphus. Arsinoe II, Philotera were her maternal half-aunts, while Ptolemy II was her maternal half-uncle.

Early life
Like her brother, Theoxena was born between 301 BC-298 BC. Along with her brother they were born and raised in Sicily. When Agathocles felt his death was approaching, he had sent away the elder Theoxena and their children to Egypt. Theoxena’s father died in 289 BC and her father declared his kingdom as a democracy on his death. Theoxena, her brother with their mother; spent their remaining youth in Egypt, possibly in the court living with Ptolemy I and Berenice I in Alexandria.

Remaining life
Little is known on the adult life of Theoxena. Theoxena married an unknown person whose name is lost. By her husband, Theoxena had two children; one child whose name is lost and a son called Agathocles.

Sometime in the reign of Ptolemy II reigned 283 BC-246 BC, her uncle had banished her to the Thebaid, perhaps to Coptos. Theoxena had brought false accusations to Ptolemy II against parties she knew. The names of these persons are lost as they were recorded on a papyrus, which has been damaged. It can be chronologically plausible that these events were connected to the exile of Arsinoe I. Arsinoe I was the first wife of Ptolemy II and was exiled in 274 BC/273 BC.

References

Sources
 Ancient Library article: Archagathus, No. 1 & 2
 Ancient Library article: Theoxena no. 1
 Ancient Library article: Magas no.1
 Berenice I article at Livius.org
 Ptolemaic Dynasty - Affiliated Lines: The Antipatrids & Agathocles
 Ptolemaic Genealogy: Berenice I
 Ptolemaic Genealogy: Theoxena
 R.S. Bagnall, Archagathos son of Agathocles, Epistates of Libya, Columbia University Department of Greek & Latin, New York, USA, 1976

300s BC births
290s BC births
4th-century BC Greek people
3rd-century BC Greek people
4th-century BC Greek women
3rd-century BC Greek women
Ancient Syracusans
Greek exiles
Ptolemaic dynasty
Ptolemaic Alexandria
Ptolemaic court
Women of the Ptolemaic Kingdom